Zhang Lebin (born April 1958) is a former Chinese politician who spent most of his career in Communist Youth League of China Central Committee. He previously served as deputy director of the State Administration for Religious Affairs. As of September 2015 he was under investigation by the Communist Party's anti-corruption agency.

Life and career
Born in Bo'ai County, Henan in April 1958, he graduated from Xinxiang Normal College in July 1982.

He became involved in politics in August 1977, and joined the Chinese Communist Party in December 1983.

In August 1977 he was a worker in Tractor Station in his hometown, and soon taught school.

In July 1984 he was promoted to become his hometown's party secretary of the Communist Youth League, a position he held until December 1987. Then he was transferred to the Communist Youth League of China Central Committee and over a period of 13 years worked his way up to the position of deputy director of the State Administration for Religious Affairs.

On September 22, 2015, the CCP Central Commission for Discipline and Inspection announced that he has come under investigation for "serious violation of discipline." He was expelled from the party on January 5, 2016.

References

1958 births
Central Party School of the Chinese Communist Party alumni
Living people
Central China Normal University alumni
Expelled members of the Chinese Communist Party